The following is a list of power pop albums by notable artists that have been described as such by music reviews, or any similar source. They are listed chronologically, with the older ones at the top of the list.

1970s

1980s

1990s

2000s

2010s

See also
List of power pop artists and songs
Lists of albums

References

Bibliography

 
Power pop